Monika Vogelsang is a 1920 German silent historical drama film directed by Rudolf Biebrach and starring Henny Porten, Paul Hartmann and Ernst Deutsch.

The film's sets were designed by the art director Emil Hasler and Jack Winter. Location shooting took place at Rothenburg in Bavaria.

Cast
 Henny Porten as Monica Vogelsang 
 Paul Hartmann as Amadeo Vaselli, Kirchenmaler 
 Ernst Deutsch as Johannes Walterspiel 
 Gustav Botz as Jacobus Martinus Vogelsang, Ratsherr zu Baldersgrün 
 Elsa Wagner as Ursula Schwertfeger, Monikas Amme 
 Julius Sachs as Giacomo Vaselli, Monikas Lehrer 
 Ilka Grüning as Witwe Walterspiel 
 Wilhelm Diegelmann as Erzbischof Josephus Hammerschid 
 Max Maximilian as Der Weibl 
 Wilhelm Schmidt as Nachtwächter

References

Bibliography
 Bock, Hans-Michael & Bergfelder, Tim. The Concise CineGraph. Encyclopedia of German Cinema. Berghahn Books, 2009.

External links

1920 films
Films of the Weimar Republic
Films directed by Rudolf Biebrach
German silent feature films
German black-and-white films
Films based on German novels
UFA GmbH films
1920s historical drama films
German historical drama films
Films set in the 16th century
Films set in the Holy Roman Empire
1920 drama films
Silent historical drama films
1920s German films
1920s German-language films